This is the discography for the British pop singer Sandie Shaw.

UK studio albums
 Sandie (UK No. 3, 1965, US No. 100)
 Me (1965)
 Love Me, Please Love Me (1967)
 The Sandie Shaw Supplement (1968)
 Reviewing the Situation (1969)
 Choose Life (1983)
 Hello Angel (1988)

UK compilation albums
 The Golden Hits of Sandie Shaw (1966)
 Puppet on a String (1967)
 64/67 Pye Anthology (1993)
 Nothing Less Than Brilliant (UK No. 64, 1994)
 Pourvu Que Ça Dure - Chante En Français (2003)
 La Cantante Scalza – Canta In Italiano (2003)
 Wiedehopf Im Mai - Sandie Shaw Singt Auf Deutsch (2004)
 Marionetas En La Cuerda - Sandie Shaw Canta En Español (2004)
 Nothing Comes Easy (4-CD box set) (2004)
 The Very Best of Sandie Shaw (UK No. 60, 2005)
 The Collection (2007)

Note: It would be nearly impossible to list all the albums ever released containing Shaw's material (many major and minor labels have released compilations of her work since the 1960s), so only original albums and "main" compilations are listed, along with the EMI releases which have been issued since Shaw licensed her catalogue to them.

UK EPs
 (There's) Always Something There to Remind Me (1964)
 Long Live Love (1965)
 Talk About Love (1965)
 Message Understood (1966)
 Tomorrow (1966)
 Nothing Comes Easy (1966)
 Run with Sandie (1966)
 Sandie Shaw in French (1967)
 Sandie Shaw in Italian (1967)
 Tell the Boys (1967)

Singles
Catalogue numbers, dates of release, and A-side/B-side configurations all refer to initial British releases only. Information may vary for releases in other territories.

Notes

References 

Discographies of British artists
Pop music discographies